Labor of Love is the second studio album by American country music artist Radney Foster. It was released in 1995 on Arista Records, peaking at #61 on the Billboard Top Country Albums charts and producing three chart singles. It was also his final release for Arista Nashville, although his third album — 1999's See What You Want to See — was issued on Arista Austin.

History
Initially, the album was to have been released in 1994 under the title Never Say Die. However, after lead-off single "Labor of Love" failed to reach Top 40, the album was delayed twice so that it would not interfere with Foster's contribution to a Merle Haggard tribute album. "Willin' to Walk" was issued as the second single in 1995, with its radio edit having been remixed by Steve Ripley of The Tractors. Closing out the album was "If It Were Me". These three singles peaked at #58, #54 and #59, respectively, on the Billboard country charts.

Track listing
"Willin' to Walk" (Radney Foster) – 2:39
"Labor of Love" (Foster, Cindy Bullens) – 3:38
"My Whole Wide World" (Foster, Bullens) – 4:31
"Never Say Die" (Foster, George Ducas) – 4:08
"Jesse's Soul" (Foster, Tim DuBois) – 4:40
"Everybody Gets the Blues" (Foster, Ducas) – 3:04
"If It Were Me" (Foster, Kim Richey) – 4:40
"Broke Down" (Foster, Gary Nicholson) – 3:24
"Precious Pearl" (Foster) – 4:13
"Last Chance for Love" (Foster) – 4:05
"Walkin' Talkin' Woman" (Foster) – 2:37
"Making It Up as I Go" (Foster) – 4:35

Personnel

Appearing On The Album
Joan Besen – piano, clavinet, bells
Sam Bush – fiddle
Mary Chapin Carpenter – background vocals
Joey Click – bass guitar
Deryl Dodd – background vocals
Dan Dugmore – acoustic guitar, pedal steel guitar
Steve Fishell – pedal steel guitar, lap steel guitar
Radney Foster – acoustic guitar, lead vocals, background vocals
Bill Hullett – lead guitar, 12-string guitar
Carl Jackson – background vocals
Michael Joyce – bass guitar
Albert Lee – lead guitar, mandolin
Jimmy Maddox – Hammond B-3 organ
Mike McAdam – lead guitar, electric guitar, acoustic guitar, 6-string bass guitar
Bob Mummert – drums, percussion, timpani, castanets
Lloyd Maines – pedal steel guitar
Lee Roy Parnell – slide guitar
Kim Richey – background vocals
Harry Stinson – background vocals
Pete Wasner – piano

Radney's Touring Band
As Listed In Liner Notes
Mike McAdam - guitars
Jimmie Crawford: steel guitar
Jimmy "Dusty Fingers" Maddox - piano, B-3 organ
Joey Click - bass
Bob Mummert - drums, percussion

Production
Produced By Steve Fishell For Jackalope Productions & Radney Foster
Recorded By Mike Poole; Assisted By Ed Simonton
Mixed By Chuck Ainlay; Assisted By Graham Lewis
Digital Editing By Don Cobb
Mastered By Denny Purcell

Chart performance

References

1995 albums
Arista Records albums
Radney Foster albums